Dalton Kincaid (born October 18, 1999) is an American football tight end. He played college football for the San Diego Toreros before transferring to Utah in 2020.

High school career 
Kincaid attended Faith Lutheran High School in Summerlin, Nevada. Growing up, Kincaid mostly played basketball, winning an AAU Championship in his senior year. He would play only one season of high school football, after his friends convinced him to join the team. That season, he would earn all state honors totaling 745 yards and eight touchdowns. He would decide to become a walk-on and play college football at the University of San Diego.

College career 
As a freshman in 2018, Kincaid would record 374 yards and 11 touchdowns on 24 catches. The following season, Kincaid would have 44 receptions for 835 yards and eight touchdowns while leading all FCS tight ends in yards per catch. As a result of his performance, he was named an AP FCS All-American and was a part of the Second-team All-Pioneer Football League. Kincaid would decide to transfer to Utah in 2020. Kincaid's first season at Utah was shortened by the COVID-19 pandemic, in which he played in five games. In 2021, he tallied eight touchdowns, 510 yards receiving, and 36 receptions.

References

External links 
 Utah Utes bio
 San Diego Toreros bio

Living people
1999 births
Utah Utes football players
San Diego Toreros football players
American football tight ends
Players of American football from Nevada
Sportspeople from Las Vegas